Nyctimene was, according to Greek and Roman mythology, a princess and a rape victim, the daughter of Epopeus, a king of Lesbos.

Mythology 
According to Hyginus, her father Epopeus desired her and raped her. Out of shame or guilt, she fled to the forest and refused to show her face in daylight. Taking pity on her, the goddess Athena transformed her into the nocturnal owl which, in time, became a widespread symbol of the goddess.  In Ovid's Metamorphoses, the transformation was a punishment for "desecrating her father's bed" (patrium temerasse cubile), which insinuates that she had sexual intercourse with her own father, but no further explanation is given of whether she was raped, seduced or herself the seducer. In the Metamorphoses, Nyctimene's story is narrated by Corone (the crow), who also complains that her place as Minerva's sacred bird is now being usurped by Nyctimene, who is so ashamed of herself that she will not be seen by daylight.

Servius says that Nyctimene was filled with shame after realizing she had slept with her father, implying some sort of trickery to have occurred. Another scholiast says that Nyctimene was raped not by Epopeus but rather a visiting guest named Corymbus. An anonymous Greek paradoxographer writes that she fled her father, who is here named Clymenus.

A variation of her story about Nyctaea is found in pseudo-Lactantius Placidus's commentary on the Thebaid.

Legacy 
Her name has been given to a genus of bats and an asteroid.

See also 

 Myrrha
 Harpalyce
 Philomela

References

Bibliography 
 
 Hyginus, Gaius Julius, The Myths of Hyginus. Edited and translated by Mary A. Grant, Lawrence: University of Kansas Press, 1960.
 Maurus Servius Honoratus, In Vergilii carmina comentarii. Servii Grammatici qui feruntur in Vergilii carmina commentarii; recensuerunt Georgius Thilo et Hermannus Hagen. Georgius Thilo. Leipzig. B. G. Teubner. 1881. Online version at the Perseus Digital Library.

External links 
 

Metamorphoses into birds in Greek mythology
Women in Greek mythology
Bats in culture
Deeds of Athena
Incest in Greek mythology
Incestual abuse
Mythological rape victims
Aegean Sea in mythology
Metamorphoses characters